Takanao (written:  or ) is a masculine Japanese given name. Notable people with the name include:

, Japanese samurai
, Japanese water polo player

Japanese masculine given names